Gerhard Glaß (17 July 1927 – 14 July 2010) was a German skier. He competed in the Nordic combined event at the 1956 Winter Olympics.

References

External links
 

1927 births
2010 deaths
German male Nordic combined skiers
Olympic Nordic combined skiers of the United Team of Germany
Nordic combined skiers at the 1956 Winter Olympics